Tai Po Football Club, also known as Wofoo Tai Po due to sponsorship reasons, is a Hong Kong professional football club which currently competes in the Hong Kong Premier League.

In the 2018–19 season, Tai Po successfully won their first top-flight title in club history. The club is the first district team to win a top-flight title since Yuen Long during the 1962–63 season and the first-ever district team to win the Hong Kong Premier League title.

History

Early Stage (2002–2007)
Tai Po entered the newly formed Third District Division in 2002–03 season. The club was promoted to the Second Division in 2004–05 season after claiming the title of the Third Division in the previous season. In 2005–06 season, they gained the promotion to the First Division after finishing second in the Second Division, behind HKFC.

Tai Po struggled during early stage of the 2006–07 season, conceded 13 goals in the first three league matches, which is consistent with many pre-season predictions. The club's fourth game of the season was at home against local giants South China on 30 September 2006. This was the first ever First Division match to be played at Tai Po Sports Ground. With over 2,500 supporters cheering the home team and the signings of three Brazilian players, the club played courageously and only lost the game in the last minute by 2–3. The Greens' performance vastly improved since the home game. They recorded some surprising victories including a great come back (scored a 4–3 from 1–3) against the defending league champion Happy Valley and a last minute winner (a direct free kick to make it 2–1 by defender Joel in 90') against multiple cup winner Kitchee in November 2006.

Tai Po secured their First Division berth for the 2007–08 season after defeating HKFC 3–0 on 5 April 2007, which also resulted in HKFC's relegation.

Ascension to the First Division (2007–2013) 
After their maiden top flight season, the club's coach Chan Hiu Ming left the club for the newly promoted Workable (Chinese: 華家堡). Tai Po spent most of the off-season searching for a new coach. Finally, former Hong Kong football star Tim Bredbury, who coached Rangers for a short period of time in the previous season, accepted the job. Moreover, in response to the successful and popular home game last season, Tai Po has applied for 5 home games to be played in Tai Po in the following season.

HKFA has announced the decision: the first 9 matches of Tai Po FC, no matter scheduled as home or away game, will be played in Tai Po Sports Ground. But the arrangement was strongly criticised and objected by the first game opponent, Workable's manager also Tai Po FC's ex-coach Chan Hiu Ming. Chan Hiu Ming expressed his team would not play their home game at Tai Po Sports Ground firmly and questioned the fairness about the arrangement. Eventually, HKFA re-arranged the schedule, where Tai Po would only play their home game at Tai Po Sports Ground for the entire season.

Unfortunately, Tai Po Sports Ground's refurbishment didn't help much on the pitch quality. Up to this point, no Tai Po's game has been held at Tai Po Sports Ground.

Apart from promoting players from the youth team, the team kept most of its important homegrown players, except Kan Tsz Yeung (Chinese: 簡子洋) and Chung Kin Keung (Chinese: 鍾健強), both left to join Workable. The three foreign players also stayed with the team in the new season, including the fans' favourite Christian Annan. New players was introduced after the season has started. Chinese player Ye Jia (Chinese: 葉佳) was signed from Rangers after the first match, and followed by the Brazilian forward Rafael dos Santos, Betine "Betine", who has also scored a debut goal in the match against Rangers.

The first 5 matches in the season resulted in 7 league points, which met the expectation. The contract of Tim Bredbury was terminated with agreement from both parties, however. Some notable reasons are the board disagreeing on some decisions of Bredbury on starting line up and substitution. Tim Bredbury has also had very poor relationship with the players caused by the training methods. Formation, tactics and player deployment was also highly questionable (some notable decisions were deploying players well known with skill to play in center position to the wing, and wingers were deployed in the central midfield). Chan Ho Yin (Chinese: 陳浩然) was appointed as the main coach after Tim Bredbury's departure.

Another notable events of the club in the season was the penalty dispute in the league game against Eastern AA at 2 December 2007. In the 25th minutes, Tai Po was awarded a penalty and scored by Dega. However, Dega was judged, by the game referee Pau Sai Yin, performed interrupting movement during approaching the ball. According to the rule of FIFA, for infractions by the kicking team, should a goal be scored the kick is retaken. However, the referee awarded a free kick to Eastern which has violated the rule of FIFA. After the game, Tai Po made an official objection to the HKFA and the objection has been approved by the example of the rematch decision made by FIFA on 2006 Asian World Cup Qualifying game Bahrain vs Uzbekistan. In the rematch, Tai Po won by 3–1, Dega scored a penalty kick without any disputes.

The team had some bad matches in the middle of the season but ended the season strongly, especially with two fabulous 2–1 winning against the eventually league champion South China. In the first match, Tai Po delayed the league championships declaration of South China and knocked it out of FA Cup in semi-final in the second match. Tai Po ended the league in the 3rd position with was over expectation. The team also played in first top division competition final against Citizen at 18 May 2008 in Hong Kong Stadium and lost the match 0–2.

With the success in the previous seasons, Tai Po secures several new sponsors in this season. New Territories Realty Association  and Creative Property Services Consultants Limited ertr among the more remarkable new sponsors who signe don. Tai Po starts the 2008–09 season in a rather good style. Until 22 September 2008, they have recorded three straight wins.  They have beaten Tuen Mun Progoal, Sheffield United and Pegasus respectively.

On 6 June 2009, Tai Po won 4:2 against Pegasus, in front of 4,042 fans at the Hong Kong Stadium, to lift the HKFA Cup, marking the first time a district team has won the trophy. Caleb Ekwenugo, Sze Kin Wai, Lee Wai Lim and Christian Annan scored the goals for Tai Po. In addition, Lee Wai Lim won the title of Man of the Match. Tai Po thus qualified to play in the AFC Cup in 2010.

The 2013-14 season saw Tai Po secure promotion back to the First Division after a final day victory over top of the table rivals Wong Tai Sin. Building from a strong defensive foundation, Tai Po managed to complete the season having conceded just 11 goals in 22 league games.

Top flight tribulations and glory (2013–2019)
The club gained promotion to the newly formed Hong Kong Premier League after winning the 2013–14 Second Division. The club lost its first match in Hong Kong Premier League 4–1 against Kitchee. The club finished bottom at the table at the end of the season and were relegated back to the First Division.

Having won the First Division League championship during the 2015–16 season, Tai Po were once again promoted to participate in the Hong Kong Premier League. Since having won the Senior Shield championship in 2012/13 Season, Tai Po won 2–1 to Hong Kong Pegasus in extra time, winning the first ever Sapling Cup champion in club history, as well as receiving the championship title of a tournament four seasons later. Brazilian Lucas Silva was elected the most valuable player of the tournament.

The club slowly built a stable roster of players, relying on a backbone of Igor Sartori, Chan Siu Kwan, Leung Kwun Chung, Eduardo Praes, and captain Wong Wai. The club's budget rose to an all-time high of $18 million during the 2018–19 season as management sensed an opportunity to win the title, adding Hong Kong international Sandro in February to aid their chase. The gamble paid off on 4 May 2019, Tai Po defeated R&F 2–1 in the penultimate match of the season, successfully claiming their first top flight title in club history. The club became the first district team to win a top-flight title since Yuen Long in 1962–63.

Self relegation (2020–2022)
Tai Po's struggles off the pitch, however, commenced immediately after their title winning season. After budget cuts forced the club to say goodbye to their title winning head coach Lee Chi Kin and most of their starters, the impact of the 2020 coronavirus pandemic in Hong Kong during the 2019–20 season led to the club encountering salary arrears. Fung Hoi Man, who was hired at the beginning of the season as the club's head coach and director of football, resigned in May 2020 in order to ease the financial strain on the club. However, Tai Po could not secure short term funding to continue on with the season, and on 29 May 2020, the Greens announced that they would withdraw from both the league and the 2020 AFC Cup. Two weeks later, Tai Po confirmed their withdrawal from participation in the 2020–21 Hong Kong Premier League.

Frustrated with the club's mismanagement, the Tai Po District Council voted unanimously on 7 July 2020 to revoke the club's authority to represent the District for the 2020–21 season.

Return to top flight (2022–)
In July 2022, Tai Po accepted HKFA's invitation to be promoted to the 2022–23 Hong Kong Premier League.

Name history 
2002–2006: Tai Po (大埔)
2006–2008: Wofoo Tai Po (和富大埔)
2008–2011: NT Realty Wofoo Tai Po (新界地產和富大埔)
2011–2015：Wofoo Tai Po (和富大埔)
2015–2016：Tai Po (大埔)
2016–：Wofoo Tai Po (和富大埔)

Team staff
{|class="wikitable"
|-
!Position
!Staff
|-
|Head coach||  Li Hang Wui
|-
|Assistant coach||  Lui Chi Hing
|-
|Assistant coach||  Ye Jia
|-
|Assistant coach||  Tam Lok Hin
|-
|Assistant coach||  Lok Wai Nin
|-
|Assistant coach||  Tam Long Ming
|-
|Goalkeeping coach||

Current squad

First team

 LP

 FP

 FP

 (on loan from Lee Man)
 FP

 FP

Remarks:
LP These players are registered as local players in Hong Kong domestic football competitions.
FP These players are registered as foreign players.

Stadium

2006–07 season
Tai Po played their first home matches on Tai Po Sports Ground at 30 September 2006, against South China. As a public integrated sport facilities and is owned by the Leisure and Cultural Services Department (Hong Kong Government), the pitch and grass quality are insufficient to meet the requirement of professional football.

2007–08 season
However, with the refurbishment in 2007, Tai Po has applied to have 5 home games, between September to November, to be held in the Sports Ground in season 2007–08.

The Hong Kong Football Association later decided the first 9 matches of Tai Po, no matter scheduled as home or away game, will be played in Tai Po Sports Ground however, which is even more than the club demanded.

The HKFA also considered arranging two matches on the same match day at the sports ground. (This type of arrangement is common in recent years of Hong Kong First Division League game, where two matches will be played immediately one after another in the same stadium, usually in weekend, so that fans can watch two matches with single match ticket price. It's known as double header. (Chinese: 雙料娛樂)

However, in a 2007–08 pre-season pitch examination, HKFA eventually decided that the ground was not up to standard for First Division matches and in the end no game was held at the ground.

2008–09 season
HKFA finally decided all the 12 Home games of Tai Po in the season will be played in Tai Po Sports Ground. Therefore, Tai Po Sports Ground became the home stadium of Tai Po FC from then on, until now.

Nearly two years after Tai Po played their first ever home game in the sports ground in the First Division, Tai Po played the home game at the sports ground again against Sheffield United (Hong Kong) on 13 September 2008. 1,136 fans attended the game and Tai Po won 2:1.

Supporters

Tai Po fans are generally Tai Po District residents. The fans also give enough impact in terms of quantity and atmosphere.

Book
Wofoo Tai Po published its own book to commemorate its first season in the Hong Kong First Division League. The book is titled Wofoo Tai Po – where dreams come true (和富大埔—足可圓夢). The book has about 160 colour pages and is completely in Chinese. It contains many player interviews, history and views on district football and Hong Kong's participation in the Homeless World Cup. It retails at HK$68 (US$9). Its International Standard Book Number is: 978-988-99851-1-0.

Season-to-season record

Note:

Continental record

Retired numbers

Honours

League
 Hong Kong Premier League
 Champions (1): 2018–19
 Runners-up (1): 2017–18
 Hong Kong First Division
 Champions (2): 2015–16, 2021-2022
 Hong Kong Second Division
 Champions (1): 2013–14
 Runners-up (1): 2005–06
 Hong Kong Third Division
  Champions (1): 2003–04

Cup
Hong Kong FA Cup
 Champions (1): 2008–09
 Runners-up (3): 2007–08, 2010–11, 2017–18
Hong Kong Senior Shield
 Champions (1): 2012–13
 Runners-up (1): 2018–19
Hong Kong Sapling Cup
 Champions (1): 2016–17
 Runners-up (1): 2017–18
Hong Kong Community Cup
 Runners-up (1): 2018
Hong Kong FA Cup Preliminary Round
 Runners-up (1): 2015–16

Head coaches
 Chan Hiu Ming (2006–2007)
 Tim Bredbury (2007)
 Chan Ho Yin (2008–2009)
 Cheung Po Chun (2009–2013)
 Pau Ka Yiu (2013–2016)
 Lee Chi Kin (2016–2019)
 Fung Hoi Man,  Kwok Kar Lok (2019)
 Fung Hoi Man (2019–2020)
 Davor Berber (2020)
 Chan Yuk Chi (2020–2022)
 Li Hang Wui (2022–)

References

External links
 Tai Po F.C. Official Facebook Page
 Tai Po on HKFA

 
Hong Kong Premier League
2002 establishments in Hong Kong